Ionia County is a county located in the U.S. state of Michigan. As of the 2020 census, the population was 66,804. The county seat is Ionia. The Ionia County Courthouse was designed by Claire Allen, a prominent southern Michigan architect.

Ionia County is part of the Grand Rapids-Kentwood metropolitan statistical area.

History
The county is named for Ionia, a historic area of Greece. It was defined by act of the Territorial Legislature in 1831, and was organized in 1837.

Geography

Adjacent counties
Gratiot County – northeast
Montcalm County – north
Clinton County – east
Kent County – west
Eaton County – southeast
Barry County – southwest

Major highways
 is an east–west freeway running through the heart of Ionia County. The freeway can be used to access Grand Rapids, to the west, and Lansing and Detroit, to the east.
 is an east–west highway that runs north of I-96. The highway runs through the city of Ionia.
 is an east–west highway that runs in the northwest of Ionia County, including access to Belding.
 is a highway in the southwest of Ionia County, following a largely east–west route. The highway runs through Lake Odessa.
 is the primary north–south thoroughfare in Ionia County. Running through the center of the county, the highway also passes through downtown Ionia. M-66 is one of Michigan's longest state trunkline highways, running from the Indiana border near Sturgis to Charlevoix, on Lake Michigan.
 is a highway in the northwest of Ionia County, beginning at M-44 near Belding and running north toward Greenville.
 is a former US Route that travelled east–west in Ionia County, along what is today known as Grand River Avenue. The highway was replaced by I-96 in 1962.

Demographics

As of the 2000 census, there were 61,518 people, 20,606 households, and 15,145 families residing in the county. There were 22,006 housing units at an average density of 38 per square mile (15/km2). The racial makeup of the county was 91.96% White, 4.56% Black or African American, 0.56% Native American, 0.32% Asian, 0.01% Pacific Islander, 1.04% from other races, and 1.55% from two or more races. 2.78% of the population were Hispanic or Latino of any race. 29.0% were of German, 14.7% American, 11.6% English, 8.9% Irish and 5.3% Dutch ancestry. 96.3% spoke English and 2.6% Spanish as their first language.

There were 20,606 households, out of which 38.10% had children under the age of 18 living with them, 58.70% were married couples living together, 10.10% had a female householder with no husband present, and 26.50% were non-families. 21.90% of all households were made up of individuals, and 8.90% had someone living alone who was 65 years of age or older. The average household size was 2.70 and the average family size was 3.15.

The county's population spread included 26.90% under the age of 18, 11.50% from 18 to 24, 31.00% from 25 to 44, 20.50% from 45 to 64, and 10.00% who were 65 years of age or older. The median age was 33 years. For every 100 females, there were 115.20 males. For every 100 females age 18 and over, there were 120.40 males.

The median income for a household in the county was $43,074, and the median income for a family was $49,797. Males had a median income of $36,995 versus $25,443 for females. The per capita income for the county was $17,451. About 6.80% of families and 8.70% of the population were below the poverty line, including 10.40% of those under age 18 and 8.10% of those age 65 or over.

Government
Ionia County has been reliably Republican from the beginning. Since 1884, the Republican Party nominee has carried the county vote in 82% of the elections (29 of 35 elections).

The county government operates the jail, maintains rural roads, operates the major local courts, records deeds, mortgages, and vital records, administers public health regulations, and participates with the state in the provision of social services. The county board of commissioners controls the budget and has limited authority to make laws or ordinances. In Michigan, most local government functions—police and fire, building and zoning, tax assessment, street maintenance, etc.—are the responsibility of individual cities and townships.

Elected officials

 Prosecuting attorney: Kyle B. Butler
 Sheriff: Charlie Noll
 County clerk: Greg Geiger
 County treasurer: Judith Clark
 Register of deeds: Rhonda Lake
 Drain commissioner: Robert Rose
 County Commissioner District 1: David Hodges
 County Commissioner District 2: Larry Tiejema
 County Commissioner District 3: Karen Banks
 County Commissioner District 4: Ally Cook
 County Commissioner District 5: Scott Wirtz
 County Commissioner District 6: Jack Shattuck
 County Commissioner District 7: Georgia Sharp

(information )

Education 
Public school districts serving Ionia County include:

 Belding Area Schools
 Carson City-Crystal Area Schools
 Central Montcalm Public Schools
 Grand Ledge Public Schools
 Greenville Public Schools
 Ionia Public Schools
 Lakewood Public Schools
 Lowell Area Schools
 Pewamo-Westphalia Community Schools
 Portland Public Schools
 Saranac Community Schools
 Thornapple Kellogg Schools

Communities

Cities
Belding
Ionia (county seat)
Portland

Villages

Clarksville
Hubbardston (part)
Lake Odessa
Lyons
Muir
Palo
Pewamo
Saranac

Townships

Berlin Township
Boston Township
Campbell Township
Danby Township
Easton Township
Ionia Township
Keene Township
Lyons Township
North Plains Township
Odessa Township
Orange Township
Orleans Township
Otisco Township
Portland Township
Ronald Township
Sebewa Township

Unincorporated communities 

 Berlin Center
 Collins
 Cooks Corners
 Dildine
 Elmdale
 Matherton
 Orleans
 Palo
 Sebewa
 Shiloh
 Smyrna

See also
 List of Michigan State Historic Sites in Ionia County, Michigan
National Register of Historic Places listings in Ionia County, Michigan

References

External links
Ionia County official website
Ionia Montcalm Magazine website
Ionia County Historical Society website

 
Michigan counties
Grand Rapids metropolitan area
1837 establishments in Michigan
Populated places established in 1837